Tetradiclis is a genus of flowering plants belonging to the family Nitrariaceae.

Its native range is Europe, Pakistan, Africa and Temperate Asia.

Species:

Tetradiclis corniculata 
Tetradiclis tenella

References

Nitrariaceae
Sapindales genera